{{Infobox album
| name = Action
| type = EP
| artist = NU'EST
| cover = ActionEPCover.jpg
| alt = 
| released = 
| genre = 
| length = 
| label = 
| producer = 
| prev_title = 
| prev_year = 
| next_title = Hello| next_year = 2013
}}Action is the first mini-album by South Korean boy group NU'EST. It was released on July 11, 2012, by Pledis Entertainment and distributed by LOEN Entertainment.

The EP was a commercial success peaking at number 4 on the Gaon Album Chart. The EP has sold over 20,770 hard copies as of December 2012.

Background and release
On the 27th of June, 2012, it was announced that NU'EST will make a comeback in Mid-July with a new album. On July 1, the album jacket photo as well as the release date of their new mini-album was revealed.  The teaser video for the title track Action was released on YouTube on July 5, and features the members in individually themed settings, with action-filled shots and heart-pounding music; this was followed by another teaser on July 8. The full music video was released on July 10, 2012.

Promotion
The group made a comeback performance with their title track Action on Mnet's M! Countdown at its July 12 episode. This was followed by a comeback performance on KBS Music Bank, MBC's Music Core and SBS' Inkigayo.

On August 2, 2012, it was announced that the group would conclude promotions for Action and will continue with their third single, Not Over You. The full music video was released in August 12, 2012.

 Commercial performance Action'' entered and peaked at number 4 on the Gaon Album Chart on the chart issue dated July 8–14, 2012. In its second week, the album fell to number 16 and to number 54 in its third week. In its fourth and final week the EP climbed to number 6.

The EP entered at number 8 on the chart for the month of July 2012, with 15,564 physical copies sold. The EP also charted at number 32 for the month of August with 2,649 copies and at number 100 for the month of September with 659 copies. The EP placed at number 73 for the year 2012, with 20,770 copies sold.

In May 2017, five years after its released, the EP re-enter the chart at number 52 with other 4 albums from the group.

Track listing

Charts

Album chart

Sales

Music Show charts

Release history

References

NU'EST albums
K-pop EPs
2012 EPs
Korean-language EPs
Kakao M EPs
Hybe Corporation EPs